Iga Świątek defeated Karolína Plíšková in the final, 6–0, 6–0, to win the women's singles tennis title at the 2021 Italian Open. It was Świątek's first WTA 1000 singles title, and the 13 points Świątek lost in the championship match is the fewest on record in a WTA 1000 final; Serena Williams previously held the record, from the 2015 Miami Open final. This was the first WTA singles final to be resolved with a 'double bagel' scoreline since Simona Halep defeated Anastasija Sevastova at the 2016 Bucharest Open, and was just the tenth such final in WTA history. With the win, Świątek broke into the top 10 of the WTA rankings for the first time.

Both finalists saved match points in prior rounds – Świątek saved two match points in her third round match against Barbora Krejčíková, whilst Plíšková saved three match points in her quarterfinal match against Jeļena Ostapenko.

Simona Halep was the defending champion, but retired due to a left calf muscle tear in the second round against Angelique Kerber.

Seeds
The top nine seeds received a bye into the second round.

Draw

Finals

Top half

Section 1

Section 2

Bottom half

Section 3

Section 4

Qualifying

Seeds

Qualifiers

Lucky losers

Draw

First qualifier

Second qualifier

Third qualifier

Fourth qualifier

Fifth qualifier

Sixth qualifier

Seventh qualifier

Eighth qualifier

WTA singles main-draw entrants

Seeds
The following are the seeded players. Seedings are based on WTA rankings as of 26 April 2021. Rankings and points before are as of 10 May 2021.

Other entrants
The following players received wild cards into the main singles draw:
  Elisabetta Cocciaretto
  Caroline Garcia
  Camila Giorgi
  Martina Trevisan
  Venus Williams

The following players received entry using a protected ranking:
  Yaroslava Shvedova
  Zheng Saisai

The following players received entry from the singles qualifying draw:
  Alizé Cornet
  Polona Hercog
  Marta Kostyuk
  Christina McHale
  Bernarda Pera
  Ajla Tomljanović
  Tamara Zidanšek
  Vera Zvonareva

The following players received entry as lucky losers:
  Kristina Mladenovic
  Laura Siegemund
  Sloane Stephens
  Patricia Maria Țig

Withdrawals 
Before the tournament
  Bianca Andreescu → replaced by  Kristina Mladenovic
  Victoria Azarenka → replaced by  Magda Linette
  Kiki Bertens → replaced by  Anastasija Sevastova
  Ons Jabeur → replaced by  Jil Teichmann
  Anett Kontaveit → replaced by  Sara Sorribes Tormo
  Svetlana Kuznetsova → replaced by  Shelby Rogers
  Karolína Muchová → replaced by  Sloane Stephens
  Anastasia Pavlyuchenkova → replaced by  Patricia Maria Țig
  Elena Rybakina → replaced by  Yaroslava Shvedova
  Donna Vekić → replaced by  Nadia Podoroska
  Venus Williams → replaced by  Laura Siegemund
  Dayana Yastremska → replaced by  Jeļena Ostapenko

During the tournament
  Jennifer Brady

Retirements 
  Ashleigh Barty
  Simona Halep
  Alison Riske

References

External links
 Main draw
 Qualifying draw

Women's Singles